Lucy Benjamin (born Lucy Jane Baker; 25 June 1970) is an English actress. After appearing in various television series including Close to Home (1989–1990), Press Gang (1989–1993) and Jupiter Moon (1990, 1996), she was cast in the BBC soap opera EastEnders as Lisa Fowler in 1998, for which she received a nomination for Most Popular Actress at the 2001 National Television Awards.

Following her initial departure from the soap in 2003, she competed in The X Factor: Battle of the Stars (2006) which she won, as well as competing in I'm a Celebrity...Get Me Out of Here! (2009). She made guest returns to EastEnders in 2010 and 2017, while also appearing in series such as Casualty and Doctors. From 2019 to 2020, she reprised her role as Lisa on EastEnders on a regular basis.

Early life
Benjamin was born on 25 June 1970 in Reading, Berkshire as Lucy Jane Baker. While attending school in Sandhurst, she performed in school concerts; her parents were informed by one of her primary school teachers that she had drama talent and advised them to let her attend a nearby theatre school. She began attending Redroofs Theatre School in Maidenhead, and began dance lessons at the age of nine. She took the stage surname of Benjamin from her brother.

Career
Benjamin's first acting role was as a child actress in Doctor Who in 1983, playing a younger version of the character Nyssa in Mawdryn Undead. In 1989, she starred in the children's television programme Press Gang, where she played Julie Craig. From 1989 to 1990, Benjamin appeared in two series of LWT sitcom Close to Home, playing Paul Nicholas' teenage daughter Kate Shepherd. Also in 1990, Benjamin appeared in the British Satellite Broadcasting (BSB) Galaxy Channel soap opera Jupiter Moon. In 1995, she appeared in the Adrian Edmondson and Rik Mayall comedy Bottom.

From 1998 to 2003, she played Lisa Fowler in the BBC soap opera EastEnders. During her time on the programme, Benjamin was involved in one of the soap's most viewed storylines, known as "Who Shot Phil?" (2001). The storyline centered on the shooting of her on-screen lover Phil Mitchell, and who, out of the many potential candidates, was responsible. Her character was eventually revealed to be the shooter. She was asked back for a short period in 2003, to help with the forthcoming exit of Steve McFadden, who was taking a hiatus from the programme. After leaving EastEnders, Benjamin appeared in the BBC television programme The Afternoon Play and the BBC medical drama Casualty. She has also appeared in pantomimes across London, as well as touring for 6 months in the play Framed. In April 2006, the Daily Mirror reported that Benjamin was in talks with EastEnders about reprising the role of Lisa Fowler. Benjamin stated in an interview that all rumours of her returning to EastEnders were inaccurate.

In June 2006, Benjamin appeared on The X Factor: Battle of the Stars, which she won. She was mentored by judge Louis Walsh. She also appeared as Heather in Stephen Fry's drama Kingdom.  In October 2006, Benjamin appeared in an episode of the BBC soap opera Doctors. In September 2008, she appeared in All Star Family Fortunes, winning £10,000 for her charity Rosie's Rainbow Fund. Benjamin then starred in The Pretender Agenda at the New Players Theatre with Lee Ryan, as well as starring in the horror film Not Alone. In 2009, she was a contestant in the ITV1 series I'm a Celebrity...Get Me Out of Here! In August 2010, Benjamin returned to EastEnders for one episode in a storyline that was building up to the exit of Barbara Windsor.

In 2013, Benjamin starred as Velma Von Tussle in the UK tour of the West End stage show Hairspray. Between April and July 2017, Benjamin had a recurring role as Denise Ellisson in Casualty. Benjamin reprised her role as Lisa for a short stint in July 2017, part of on-screen daughter Louise Mitchell's (Tilly Keeper) bullying storyline.

In 2014 Benjamin presented the role of Maggie in the comedy series Detectorists.

On 27 May 2019, it was announced that Benjamin would be returning to EastEnders on a permanent basis. She returned on 2 September 2019, and departed in January 2020 alongside Keeper. In May 2021, she starred in another episode of the BBC soap opera Doctors as Jan Fisher. For her appearance in Doctors, she won the award for Acting Performance at the RTS Midlands Awards. The win marked her first award in her career. In 2022, she reprised her role of Jan in Doctors.

Personal life
Benjamin married Richard Taggart, an oil businessman, at Babington House, Somerset on 30 March 2006. The couple met during a flight to Dubai and became engaged three months later. Benjamin and Taggart now live in Gidea Park, Greater London.

In the first episode of The X Factor: Battle of the Stars on 31 May 2006, Sharon Osbourne accidentally revealed that Benjamin was pregnant. Benjamin smiled while host Kate Thornton commented: "I don't think you wanted that announced tonight, did you?" Benjamin gave birth by caesarean section to a daughter at Harold Wood Hospital in London on 22 November 2006. On 19 October 2010, she revealed that she was three months pregnant with her second child. In April 2011, she gave birth to a second daughter.

In May 2015, she was awarded £157,250 by Mr Justice Mann as part of a £1.2 million celebrity payout during the phone hacking scandal of the Mirror Group newspapers (Trinity Mirror), under her married name Lucy Taggart.

Filmography

Stage

Awards and nominations

References

External links 
 

1970 births
Living people
20th-century English actresses
21st-century English actresses
Actresses from Berkshire
English child actresses
English film actresses
English soap opera actresses
English television actresses
I'm a Celebrity...Get Me Out of Here! (British TV series) participants
People educated at Redroofs Theatre School
actors from Reading, Berkshire
The X Factor (British TV series) winners